Teotlalpan is a town of Chignahuapan, in the state of Puebla.

See also 
Chignahuapan

References

Populated places in Puebla
Nahua settlements